China-Ghanaian relations refer to the current and historical relationship between the Republic of Ghana and the People's Republic of China (PRC).

History

Relations between the two countries date back to 1960 when the countries first established diplomatic relations.  Since then Ghana has provided substantial diplomatic support to the PRC with the PRC reciprocating with material support for Ghana's development.  In the 1960s President Nkrumah lobbied for the PRC's reinstatement in the United Nations. Nkrumah also supported the PRC during the Sino-Indian War in 1962.  Nkrumah's dressing changed to the Chinese-supplied Mao suit. After the Nkrumah regime was overthrown Beijing withdrew around 200 Chinese aid workers and embassy staff. After the coup, Nkrumah stayed in Beijing for four days and Premier Zhou Enlai treated Nkrumah with courtesy. In the early 1990s China built Ghana's National Theatre as a reward for Ghana's diplomatic support during the Tiananmen Square protests in 1989. After Kufuor was elected president of Ghana in 2001 the PRC gave Ghana a US$2.4 million grant to renovate the theatre.

Official visits

The two countries have enjoyed a strong relationship since 1960, with high-level official visits to China by then President Nkrumah and reciprocal visits to Ghana by Premier Zhou Enlai.  In 2002 Ghana's President John Kufuor made a high-level visit to China, and in 2003 China's President Hu Jintao visited Ghana. Chinese Premier Wen Jiabao visited Ghana on the second leg of his seven-nation tour of Africa in 2007.

In September 2010 Ghanaian President John Evans Atta Mills visited China on an official visit. China reciprocated with a visit in November 2011 by the Vice Chairman of the Standing Committee of the National People's Congress of China Zhou Tienong who visited Ghana and met with Ghana's then Vice President John Dramani Mahama.

Economy
Since the 2000s the volume of Chinese trade and investment in Ghana has increased greatly. From a mere $4.4 million Chinese projects registered by the Ghana Investment Promotion Centre in 2000, Chinese registered flows had increased to $1.6 billion in 2014 alone. Despite the manufacturing sector regaining its lead as the largest retainer of Chinese investments in 2014, the General Trade sector has received a largely steady flow of Chinese investments especially since 2004 and therefore the Chinese impact felt more in the trading sector. By 2015 however, Building and Construction sectors of the Ghanaian economy had emerged the largest recipient of Chinese investment flows followed by Manufacturing and General Trade. The Liaison sector which did not attract any Chinese FDI from 2000 to 2008 began to attract Chinese investments from 2009. The Services sector also emerged a significant recipient of Chinese investments from 2006. Despite these economic flows and the tangible physical outcomes of Chinese companies highlighted in buildings and infrastructure, for most Ghanaian the Chinese presence is manifest in individual Chinese migrants trading in spaces that were hitherto dominated by Ghanaian merchants.

An indication of the importance China attaches to its economic relationship with Ghana in the West African region was the decision to open the fourth office of the China-Africa Development Fund in Accra.  Opened in November 2011 the office in Ghana focuses on the West African region for the fund.

Economic assistance

Premier Wen Jiabao's 2007 visit resulted in the signing of six agreements and a US$66 million Chinese loan to expand and upgrade Ghana's telecommunications network.  Beijing provided a concessionary loan of US$30 million to support the first phase of a telecommunications project to link all ten regional capitals and 36 towns in Ghana with fiber optic cables.

Other Chinese aid projects include:
 A $6 billion concessionary loan from the China Export Import Bank which Ghana is using to extend its rail network
 A total of US$43.5 million in development assistance to Ghana between 1964 and 1970 and has written off US$25 million of debt. Recently the China Export and Import Bank (Exim Bank) granted US$562 million loan for the construction of the US$622 million Bui hydro-electric dam.
 US$28 million interest-free loan for the construction of the 17 km Ofankor-Nsawam road completed in 2009.
 US$99 million interest-free loan for the construction of landing sites for fishing communities and the Afife rice project.
 China has provided substantial technical support to Ghana with more than 700 Ghanaians having attended Chinese-funded training courses in education, trading, communication, energy, auditing, agriculture and fisheries operation.

China-Ghanaian trade and Foreign Direct Investment 
China is currently the second largest exporter to Ghana.  In 2005 US$433.74 million worth of imports came into Ghana from China with Ghana exporting US$0.1 worth of exports.  This reflects a sharp rise in two-way trade between the two countries from $93.13 million in 2000 to $433.74 million in 2005.  Most of China's foreign direct investment in Ghana is focused on manufacturing, construction, tourism, trading and services with total investments worth US$75.8 million in 2008. Of 283 projects that Chinese nationals and SOEs have investments in 97 are in manufacturing, 59 in trading, 48 in tourism, 44 in services and 15 in construction. By 2014, total Chinese investments in Ghana had increased to $1.6 billion in that year alone. Whereas total Chinese FDI in Ghana for the 2000 to 2007 period was $199 million, cumulative investments for the 2008 to 2015 period was $2.2 billion.

In addition to macro trade and investment flows, Ghana has seen an increasing influx of Chinese entrepreneurial migrants. Largely independent of Chinese SOEs, they either remained in the country after working for big Chinese firms in Ghana or moved from China to Ghana just to trade. The capital might of the Chinese merchants trading in Ghana have culminated in substantial impacts on Ghanaian traders and trading spaces. Despite affording the average Ghanaian consumer low priced goods, they have displaced not only local Ghanaian traders but also goods coming from neighboring African countries. These have culminated in frictions between the Ghana Union of Traders Association and some Ghanaian traders in general on one part, and Chinese migrants on the other hand. Often drawing contrast with Indian and Lebanese merchants trading in Ghana, Ghanaian traders decry the indiscriminate trading patterns of Chinese merchants and their increasing concentration in spaces that are contested as markets.

Security
In April 2007 the CPPCC's Chairman, Jia Qinglin, granted a US$30 million concessional loan for the Dedicated Communications Project to foster closer military and security ties between the two countries.  This included a grant of a US$7.5 million for the construction of an office complex for Ghana's Ministry of Defence.

Ghanaian Chinese
 
Ghanaian Chinese are an ethnic group of Chinese diaspora in Ghana. The ancestors of ethnic Chinese migrants to Ghana were of Hong Kong origin. They began arriving in the late 1940s and early 1950s. In the late 1960s and early 1970s, some of the Hong Kong migrants began to bring their wives and children over to Ghana. Migrants from Shanghai also began to arrive round this time. With the economic reform and opening up in the PRC, migrants from mainland China began arriving. Migration from mainland China intensified in the 1990s; some came as employees, but most were independent traders running import-export businesses or restaurants. The sources of migration have also expanded; whereas earlier migrants came mostly from Hong Kong or Shanghai, later Chinese migrants have arrived from Guangdong and Henan as well as the Republic of China on Taiwan. As of 2009 there were an estimated 700,000 ethnic Chinese migrants  that have settled in Ghana.

References

Works cited
 

 
Africa–China relations
China, Peoples Republic
Ghana